Brădești is a commune in Dolj County,  Oltenia, Romania with a population of 4,785 people. It is composed of six villages: Brădești, Brădeștii Bătrâni, Meteu, Piscani, Răcari (Răcarii de Jos from 1968 to 2017) and Tatomirești.

Natives
 Ristea Priboi

See also
Castra of Răcarii de Jos

References

Communes in Dolj County
Localities in Oltenia